This is a list of forts and camps in California, established by military, commercial and other interests.

List

See also
Geography of California
List of forts

Notes

References
 Heizer, Robert F., The Destruction of California Indians, University of Nebraska Press, Lincoln and London, 1993. .

External links
 California State Military Museum List of Camps and Posts

Lists of buildings and structures in California
Geography of California
California